Norwegian County Road 5386 is a county road in the municipality of Voss in Vestland county, Norway.

The road branches off from National Road 13 at Palmafossen, just east of the village of Vossevangen, and it runs parallel to the Bergen Line until it terminates at the Mjølfjell Mountain Lodge and Youth Hostel (Mjølfjell Ungdomsherberge) in Mjølfjell. At Ygre, County Road 5388 branches off to the hamlets of Nedra Kyte, Nordheim (also known as Norheim), and Øvre Kyte before circling back to rejoin County Road 5386 at Klyve (also known as Kløve).

The westernmost part of the road is also known as Tjukkebygdevegen ('Tjukkebygdi Road') after the village of Tjukkebygdi, and the remainder is also known as Raundalsvegen ('Raun Valley Road') after the Raun Valley.

The road was re-numbered in 2019 because Hordaland and Sogn og Fjordane counties were scheduled to merge and there were county roads in both counties with the same number. This road previously was County Road 307.

References

External links
Statens vegvesen – trafikkmeldinger Fv307 (Traffic Information: County Road 307)

5386
Voss